I Capture the Castle is a 2003 British romantic comedy film directed by Tim Fywell. It is based on the 1948 novel of the same name by Dodie Smith, with the screenplay written by Heidi Thomas. The film was released in the UK on 9 May 2003.

Romola Garai played the lead role of Cassandra Mortmain alongside Bill Nighy, Rose Byrne and Tara Fitzgerald.

Synopsis
The film follows 17-year-old Cassandra Mortmain, and her eccentric family, struggling to survive in genteel poverty in a decaying English castle. The characters include her father, a writer who hasn't written anything in the 12 years since the spectacular success of his first novel; her older sister Rose, who rails against their fate and hopes to marry for money; and their bohemian stepmother, Topaz, an ex-model still apt to sun-bathe in the nude. The possibility of salvation seems to loom in the form of their wealthy American landlord Simon Cotton and his brother Neil. Although Simon initially spurns her, Rose is determined to make him fall in love with her and succeeds. A wedding is arranged and Cassandra appears to be left on the sidelines. Cassandra is confused not only by her feelings for the Cottons but also for Stephen Colley. Stephen is the incredibly attractive son of the Mortmains' former chef who acts as a handyman to the family and is deeply in love with Cassandra. But events spiral out of control, and before the summer ends many expectations will have been overturned.

Production
Parts of the film were  shot in Laxey film studio on the Isle of Man. Manorbier Castle in Pembrokeshire, Wales, supplied exteriors for the castle, and Eltham Palace in London some interiors.

Main cast

Reception 
On the basis of 81 reviews collected by the film review aggregator Rotten Tomatoes, 80% of critics gave I Capture the Castle a positive review, with an average rating of 6.7/10.

References

External links 
 

2003 films
2003 romantic comedy films
BBC Film films
British romantic comedy films
2003 directorial debut films
Films about families
Films about writers
Films based on British novels
Films directed by Tim Fywell
Films produced by David Parfitt
Films scored by Dario Marianelli
Films set in the 1930s
Films set in castles
Films set in England
Films shot in the Isle of Man
Films shot in London
Films shot in Pembrokeshire
Films based on works by Dodie Smith
Films about sisters
2000s English-language films
2000s British films